William Edmunds (23 January 1898 – q4 1964) was an English professional footballer who played as a centre forward in the Football League for Darlington. He also played non-league football in the north-east of England for clubs including Shildon, Spennymoor United and Trimdon Grange.

Life and career
Edmunds was born in Trimdon Grange, County Durham, the third child of James Edmunds, a coal miner, and his wife Sarah. He played North-Eastern League football for clubs including Shildon and Spennymoor United before, at the age of 23, signing for Darlington ahead of their first season in the Football League. A "towering centre forward", Edmunds went straight into the first eleven for the opening match, at home to Halifax Town in the newly formed Third Division North. He scored a late consolation goal in a 5–1 loss in the reverse fixture, but was left out in favour of George Stevens for the next match, a 7–0 defeat of Chesterfield, and dropped into the reserves.

A scoring spree in the North-Eastern League after Christmas earned him a recall to the first team. He duly scored three times as Darlington beat Tranmere Rovers 4–1 at home, and played in the next five matches, scoring twice (against Stalybridge Celtic and Wigan Borough) before returning to the reserves. At the end of the season, he played on the losing side in the Durham Senior Cup final against Sunderland reserves.

At the time of the 1939 Register, Edmunds was working as a mental nurse at Winterton Hospital, Sedgefield. He died in Trimdon Village in 1964 at the age of 66.

References

1898 births
1964 deaths
People from Trimdon Grange
Footballers from County Durham
English footballers
Association football forwards
Shildon A.F.C. players
Spennymoor United F.C. players
Darlington F.C. players
Trimdon Grange F.C. players
English Football League players